Berg Ice Stream is an ice stream about  long flowing into Carroll Inlet between Rydberg Peninsula and Espenschied Nunatak, on the English Coast. It was mapped by the United States Geological Survey from surveys and from U.S. Navy air photos, 1961–66, and named by the Advisory Committee on Antarctic Names after Captain Harold Berg, commander of USNS Eltanin on Antarctic cruises, 1964–65.

References 

Ice streams of Antarctica
Bodies of ice of Palmer Land